Rockford Kabine (short RK) is a German artist group from Bochum (Ruhrgebiet) comprising composers and producers Antony Sharas and Marlon Marlon.
After having released various EPs and Albums in self distribution between 2002 and 2006, from then on they put their emphasis on soundtrack collaborations with different filmmakers in the field of independent porn movies. In 2013 they started working on two feature films by Norwegian filmmaker Thomas Eikrem, Le Accelerator and Detroit Rising, a martial arts thriller and a post-war trauma drama.
In 2013, further collaboration has been done with the Zonders, an international artist collective making music influenced graphic and print design.

Discography 
 Hotel Homosex (2002), EP
 If You Say Amerika (2003), Single
 Live Chamber (2003), Live Album
 Black Nazi (2004), EP
 20:15 (2005), LP
 Supermarkt E. P. (2006), EP
 Italian Music  (2007; Carhartt/Combination Records), LP
 Mein Hass (2010), Single (with Rocko Schamoni & Cordelia Waal)
 Xero (2010), DVD+CD
 HoXXXton (2012), LP
 Copenhagen Climax (2013), LP
 Le Accelerator (2015), LP

Filmography 
 Xero (2010) 
 Cannibal Queen (2011)
 HoXXXton (2016)
 Copenhagen Climax (2016)
 Le Accelerator (2016)
 Detroit Rising (2017)

Awards 
 2010: AVN Award, Best Music Soundtrack, "Live In My Secrets", Alt porn movie by Kimberly Kane, (Vivid.Alt)
 2011: AVN Award-Nominee: Best All-Girl-Release, "Xero"
 2011: AVN Award-Nominee: Best Art Direction, "Xero"
 2011: AVN Award-Nominee: Best Music Soundtrack, "Xero"
 2011: AVN Award-Nominee: Best Tease Performance (Jayme Langford), "Xero"
 2011: AltPorn Award: Best Feature AltPorn Video

References

External links 
 Official website
 Facebook
 RK´s Youtube Channel
 RK on Bandcamp
 Soundcloud
 Hoxxxton website
 Rockford Kabine & The Zonders Collaboration
 Le Accelerator website
 Detroit Rising website

German musical groups
Trip hop groups
German film score composers